Sarbaz (also Romanized as Sarbāz; also known as Qal‘eh-ye Sarbāz – "Fort Sarbaz") is a city in and the capital of Sarbaz District, in Sarbaz County, Sistan and Baluchestan Province, Iran. At the 2006 census, its population was 1,047, in 234 families.  The overwhelming majority of the city's inhabitants are ethnic Baluch who speak the Baluchi language.

References

Populated places in Sarbaz County
Cities in Sistan and Baluchestan Province